Pandia , also designated Jupiter LXV, is a small outer natural satellite of Jupiter discovered by Scott S. Sheppard on 11 May 2018, using the 4.0-meter Víctor M. Blanco Telescope at Cerro Tololo Observatory, Chile. It was announced alongside nine other Jovian moons on 17 July 2018 and it provisionally designated S/2017 J 4 by the Minor Planet Center, after observations were collected over a long enough time span to confirm the satellite's orbit. The satellite has been found in precovery observations as early as 2003.

Discovery 

Pandia was discovered by Scott S. Sheppard and his team on 23 March 2017, but not announced until 17 July 2018 via a Minor Planet Electronic Circular from the Minor Planet Center.

Name 
The moon was named in 2019 after Pandia (Πανδία Pandīa), the Greek goddess of the full moon, daughter of Zeus and Selene. Pandia was among the most popular suggestions in a naming contest held by the Carnegie Institute on Twitter, with the most significant submission coming from the astronomy club of the Lanivet School in Cornwall, United Kingdom that was submitted on their behalf by user "@emmabray182". They chose Pandia because their school's mascot is a panda and their local village used to supply bamboo for a panda at London Zoo.

It belongs to the prograde Himalia group which are given names ending in a.

Orbit 
Like all of Jupiter's irregular moons, Pandia orbits far enough away that it is highly subject to gravitational perturbations by the Sun and other planets, which makes its orbit highly variable over time.

References 

Himalia group
Moons of Jupiter
Irregular satellites
Discoveries by Scott S. Sheppard
Astronomical objects discovered in 2017
Moons with a prograde orbit